KNAN (106.7 MHz) is a commercial FM radio station licensed to Nanakuli, Hawaii, and serving the Honolulu metropolitan area.  It has a hot adult contemporary radio format and is owned by Big D Consulting, Inc.

KNAN has an effective radiated power of 1,850 watts as a Class C2 station.  The transmitter is on Palehua Road in Akupu, Hawaii.

History

At first, it tested a Classic Hits format as part of its soft launch. The station used a cell tower to broadcast its signal while it looked for a studio and transmitter facilities. According to Will Kemp, whose Kemp Communications is a part-owner of KNAN, the future format will not be another Top 40 or Rhythmic outlet, which had been speculated because Kemp owns Rhythmic KVEG Las Vegas, Nevada. There were rumors that a fourth Rhythmic Contemporary would join the others on the Honolulu dial. "It's [meaning the new format] going to stay a secret," Kemp said.

When the station officially launched, it took a hot adult contemporary format, positioning it between Top 40 hits and mainstream adult contemporary.  A transmitter site was found in Akupu, putting KNAN's antenna amid the towers for Honolulu TV and FM stations.

References

External links

NAN
Radio stations established in 2009
2009 establishments in Hawaii